Gournay-sur-Aronde is a commune in the Oise department in northern France.

Gournay-sur-Aronde is best known for a Late Iron Age sanctuary that dates back to the 4th century BCE, and was burned and levelled at the end of the 1st century BCE.  In the 4th century AD a Gallo-Roman temple was built on the site.

See also
 Communes of the Oise department

References

Communes of Oise